Miyu Nakashio (born October 21, 1996) is a Japanese figure skater. She won gold at the 2014 ISU Junior Grand Prix in Estonia. Making her senior international debut, she won the gold medal at the Triglav Trophy in April 2015.

Programs

Competitive highlights 
GP: Grand Prix; CS: Challenger Series; JGP: Junior Grand Prix

References

External links 

 

1996 births
Japanese female single skaters
Living people
Sportspeople from Hiroshima